Paul Haarhuis and Mark Koevermans were the defending champions, but did not participate together this year.  Haarhuis did not participate this year.  Koevermans partnered David Rikl, losing in the first round.

Hendrik Jan Davids and Libor Pimek won in the final 3–6, 6–3, 7–5, against Luke Jensen and Laurie Warder.

Seeds

  Luke Jensen /  Laurie Warder (final)
  Tom Nijssen /  Cyril Suk (quarterfinals)
  Sergio Casal /  Emilio Sánchez (semifinals)
  Steve DeVries /  David Macpherson (first round)

Draw

Draw

External links
Draw

Portugal Open
1992 ATP Tour
Estoril Open